In differential calculus, the Reynolds transport theorem (also known as the Leibniz–Reynolds transport theorem), or simply the Reynolds theorem, named after Osborne Reynolds (1842–1912), is a three-dimensional generalization of the Leibniz integral rule. It is used to recast time derivatives of integrated quantities and is useful in formulating the basic equations of continuum mechanics.

Consider integrating  over the time-dependent region  that has boundary , then taking the derivative with respect to time:

Reynolds transport theorem provides the necessary framework.

General form 
Reynolds transport theorem can be expressed as follows:

The function  may be tensor-, vector- or scalar-valued. Note that the integral on the left hand side is a function solely of time, and so the total derivative has been used.

Form for a material element 
In continuum mechanics, this theorem is often used for material elements.  These are parcels of fluids or solids which no material enters or leaves. If  is a material element then there is a velocity function , and the boundary elements obey

This condition may be substituted to obtain:

A special case 
If we take  to be constant with respect to time, then  and the identity reduces to

as expected. (This simplification is not possible if the flow velocity is incorrectly used in place of the velocity of an area element.)

Interpretation and reduction to one dimension 
The theorem is the higher-dimensional extension of differentiation under the integral sign and reduces to that expression in some cases. Then Reynolds transport theorem reduces to

See also

References

External links

 Osborne Reynolds, Collected Papers on Mechanical and Physical Subjects, in three volumes, published circa 1903, now fully and freely available in digital format: Volume 1, Volume 2, Volume 3,
 
 http://planetmath.org/reynoldstransporttheorem

Aerodynamics
Articles containing proofs
Chemical engineering
Continuum mechanics
Equations of fluid dynamics
Fluid dynamics
Fluid mechanics
Mechanical engineering